Alathu Loabi is a 1994 Maldivian film written and directed by Easa Shareef.  Produced by Aslam Rasheed, the film stars Mohamed Shakeeb, Easa Shareef, Nadhiya Zahir and Niuma Abdul Raheem in pivotal roles.

Premise
Niuma (Niuma Abdul Raheem) a smart playgirl is instantly attracted to a photographer and artist, Shakeeb (Mohamed Shakeeb), who outright rejects her, which costs him the relationship between his brother and an unnecessary enmity with a wealthy and powerful businessman, Shiham, the brother of Niuma. Shakeeb moves to Th. Hirilandhoo, where he meets Greysha, an underprivileged woman who relocates to the same island evading her short-tempered landlord. Shakeeb falls in love with Greysha, who is also caught by the attention of her current landlord, Shareef (Easa Shareef), a well-mannered architect. Meanwhile, Niuma makes every attempt to trace Shakeeb to avenge him for tarnishing her reputation.

Cast 
 Mohamed Shakeeb as Shakeeb
 Easa Shareef as Shareef
 Nadhiya Zahir as Greysha
 Niuma Abdul Raheem as Niuma
 Hannaan
 Akram as Akram
 Riyaza Shakir as Riyaza
 Hassan Shiham
 Hassan Latheef

Soundtrack

Release
Upon release, the film received mixed to positive reviews from critics where Shareef's work as a director was particularly praised.

References

Maldivian drama films
1994 films
Films directed by Easa Shareef
1994 drama films
Dhivehi-language films